Edward Roche may refer to:

 Édouard Roche (1820–1883), French astronomer and mathematician
 Edward Patrick Roche (1874–1950), Newfoundlander prelate of the Roman Catholic Church
 Edward Roche (politician) (1754–1821), American politician and Revolutionary War veteran